Houxi may refer to:
 Houxi Town, in Jimei District, Xiamen City, Fujian, China
 Houxi Subdistrict in Jieyang City, Guangdong, China
 Houma–Xi'an Railway (Houxi Railway) in northern China (Shanxi and Shaanxi Provinces)